Blancs d'Espagne ("Spanish Whites") was a term used to refer to those legitimists in France who, following the death of the Comte de Chambord in 1883, supported the Spanish Carlist claimant rather than the Orleanist candidate, who was supported by the vast majority of French royalists.

The term was generally used by supporters of the Comte de Paris, the Orleanist candidate, as a term of derision for their ultra-legitimist opponents who so hated the House of Orléans that they would support a foreign prince over an Orleanist candidate. It is a pun on the cosmetic and cleanser known as blanc d'Espagne, originally a white lead pigment and later either basic bismuth nitrate or a preparation made from chalk and clay.

Dynastic rationale

Claimants or declared claimants

Notes

Legitimist pretenders to the French throne